The 12877 / 78 Ranchi New Delhi Garib Rath Express is a Superfast Express train of the Garib Rath series belonging to Indian Railways - South Eastern Railway zone that runs between Ranchi and New Delhi in India.

It operates as train number 12877 from Ranchi to New Delhi and as train number 12878 from New Delhi to Ranchi serving the states of Jharkhand, Bihar, Uttar Pradesh & Delhi.

It is part of the Garib Rath Express series launched by the former railway minister of India, Laloo Prasad Yadav.

Route
The 12877 / 78 Ranchi New Delhi Garib Rath Express runs from Ranchi via Tori, Daltonganj, Mughalsarai Junction, Allahabad Junction, Kanpur Central to New Delhi.

Service
It operates thrice a week. Ranchi-New Delhi Garib Rath Express (12877) operates on Monday, Tuesday
& Friday originating from Ranchi Junction. New Delhi-Ranchi Garib Rath Express (12878) operates on Tuesday, Thursday & Saturday originating from New Delhi Railway Station. It has a travel time of approximately 19 hrs for covering 1344 km.It is the substitute of New Delhi Ranchi Rajdhani express and it runs in Rajdhani slot.

Gallery

References

Transport in Ranchi
Transport in Delhi
Garib Rath Express trains
Rail transport in Jharkhand
Rail transport in Bihar
Rail transport in Uttar Pradesh
Rail transport in Delhi